Azficel-T, sold under the brand name Laviv, is a cell therapy product for the improvement of the appearance of moderate to severe nasolabial fold wrinkles in adults. It consists of fibroblasts harvested from the patient's own skin.

It was approved for medical use in the United States in June 2011.

References

Further reading

External links 
 
 
 

Medical treatments
Plastic surgery